New Talent Singing Awards (Traditional Chinese: 新秀歌唱大賽) or NTSA for short, later re-organised into New Talent Singing Awards International Finals (Traditional Chinese: 全球華人新秀歌唱大賽) or NTSA International Finals for short), and most currently renamed TVB8 International Chinese New Talent Singing Championship (Traditional Chinese: TVB8全球華人新秀歌唱大賽) is an annual singing competition organised by TVB that searches out new singers to enter the Asian music industry.

History

Beginning (1982–1992)
 
Held in Hong Kong only, contestants are required to compete through multiple rounds to display their vocal talent through different genres of songs and/or vocal challenges such as singing cappellas or in a different language etc.  The winner is guaranteed a recording contract with Capital Artists Recording Company.

Overseas addition (1993–1996)
With increased Hong Kong Chinese emigrated to North America, TVB opened "Overseas Contestant" category to attract contestants and held the contest in cities such as Vancouver, Calgary, Toronto, New York, Los Angeles and San Francisco.

International affair (1997–2004)
 
With the emergence of several Australian, European and Asian cities like Melbourne, London, Amsterdam and Shanghai wanting to be included in the event, in 1997, TVB Hong Kong created the New Talent Singing Awards International Finals 全球華人新秀歌唱大賽. Instead of having one "overseas contestant" from North America competing in the NTSA Finals ( now renamed the New Talent Singing Awards Hong Kong Regional Finals 全球華人新秀歌唱大賽香港區選拔賽 ), now each participating country would send regional representatives to compete in the NTSA International Finals ( much like an international beauty pageant would ).  Also, due to the downsizing of Capital Artist, Emperor Entertainment Group took over organising the contest with TVB.

EEG & Mandarin dominance (2005–present)
The international finals and the Hong Kong regional finals changed their names and logos once again in 2005.  Because of the heavy influence of co-organiser Emperor Entertainment Group (EEG), the Hong Kong regional finals is now simply called EEG Singing Contest 英皇新秀歌唱大賽, completely discarding the "New Talent" part of the English title .  As for the International Finals, since TVB has decided to move the contest to its mandarin channel, TVB8, the international finals changed its name into TVB8 International Chinese New Talent Singing Championship TVB8全球華人新秀歌唱大賽.  Because of the move, there has been many more contestants representing different regions of Mainland China since 2005.  In 2006, spots for several "Internet Region Representatives" are devoted solely to Mainland Chinese contestants who does not live in an area where a NTSA Regional contest is held.

Starting in 2009, TVB has stopped organising EEG Singing Contest and instead has its new reality-show style singing competition, The Voice 超級巨聲 select Hong Kong's representative for the International Finals.  Because the 2009 NTSA International Finals was held during the run of season one of The Voice, the show selected the contestant with the highest average score thus far, Hong Kin Chan to represent Hong Kong.  However, a day before the International Finals he pulled out due to sickness, marking it the first time Hong Kong was not represented in the history of the competition.

Cities hosted NTSA regional contests (past and/or present)
Amsterdam, The Netherlands
Auckland, New Zealand
Brisbane, Australia
Calgary, Alberta, Canada
Chicago, United States
Guangzhou, China
Hong Kong
Houston, Texas United States
Jiangsu, China
Johor, Malaysia
Kuala Lumpur, Malaysia
London, England
Los Angeles, United States
Melbourne, Australia
New York City, United States
Penang, Malaysia
Perak, Malaysia
Rotterdam, The Netherlands
Sabah, Malaysia
San Francisco, United States
Shanghai, China
Sichuan, China
Sydney, Australia
Toronto, Ontario, Canada
Tianjin, China
Vancouver, British Columbia, Canada
Winnipeg, Manitoba, Canada
Zhejiang, China
Internet Region (*Note: This is a special category reserved for Mainland Chinese contestants who lives in an area where a NTSA Regional contest is not held to compete online. )

Past winners and notable contestants

NTSA has been the start of many Asian celebrities today.  Some have stayed in the music business and have become popular performers, while some have become actors and TV presenters.  Below is a list of winners as well as past contestants who have made a contribution to the entertainment business after competing in NTSA.

See also
New Talent Singing Awards Vancouver Audition
New Talent Singing Awards Toronto Audition
Calgary New Talent Singing Awards
Jade Solid Gold Top 10 Awards
RTHK Top 10 Gold Songs Awards
The Voice

External links
NTSA International Finals 2005 Official Website
NTSA International Finals 2006 Official Website
NTSA International Finals 2007 Official Website

 
Singing talent shows
TVB original programming
Cantopop
Hong Kong music-related lists
Hong Kong television-related lists